Montluçon-Ville station (French: Gare de Montluçon-Ville) is a railway station serving the town Montluçon, Allier department, central France.

Services

The station is served by regional trains to Limoges, Bourges and Clermont-Ferrand.

References

Railway stations in Allier
Railway stations in France opened in 1859
Montluçon